The 1966 World Sportscar Championship season was the 14th season of the FIA "World Sportscar Championship" motor racing. It featured the 1966 International Manufacturers' Championship and the 1966 International Sports Car Championship, which were contested between 5 February 1966 and September 11, 1966, over a total of thirteen races. The International Manufacturers' Championship was open to Group 6 Sports-Prototypes and was contested in two engine capacity divisions, P1 (Up to 2000cc) and P2 (Over 2000cc). The International Sports Car Championship was open to Group 4 Sports Cars and was contested in three engine capacity divisions, S1 (Up to 1300cc), S2 (1301 to 2000cc) and S3 (Over 2000cc).

Schedule
The 13 championship races each counted towards one or more of the five divisions.

Both championships scored points to the top six competitors in each class, under four different tables or Baréme'. Baréme I corresponded with the old order of 9-6-4-3-2-1. Baréme II was in the order 10-7-5-4-3-2. Baréme III, valid only for Le Mans, was in the order 12-9-7-5-4-3. Baréme 0, valid only for the Grosser Bergpreis der Schweiz, was half of Baréme I'': 4.5-3-2-1.5-1-0.5. Constructors were only awarded points for their highest finishing car. Other finishers from the same manufacturer were merely skipped in the points count.

Only the best 4 results counted towards the championship (5 in S3, 6 in S2). Points earned but not counted towards the championship total are listed in (brackets).

Note: The Hockenheim 500 km race did not count towards the Over 2000cc division of the International Manufacturers Championship.

Results

International Manufacturers Championship

International Sports Car Championship

The cars
The following models contributed to the nett points awarded to their respective manufacturers in the two championships.International Manufacturers Championship - Over 2000cc Ford Mk II and Ford X-1
 Ferrari 365P2/3, Ferrari 330P3 & Ferrari 250 LM
 Chaparral 2DInternational Manufacturers Championship - Up to 2000cc Porsche 906
 Dino 206 S
 Alpine-Renault A210
 Austin-Healey Sprite
 Triumph LM
 Abarth 1300 OT
 ASA 411
 Lotus 23B BMWInternational Sports Car Championship - Division 1 Abarth 1300 OT
 Alpine Renault M65 & Alpine Renault A110
 Alfa Romeo Giulietta SZInternational Sports Car Championship - Division 2 Porsche 904 GTS & Porsche 906
 Alfa Romeo Giulia TZ2
 Lotus Elan
 Volvo P1800International Sports Car Championship - Division 3'''

 Ford GT40
 Ferrari 250 GTO & Ferrari 250 LM
 Shelby Cobra

References

External links
 1966 Sports Car racing images at www.racingsportscars.com

World Sportscar Championship seasons
World Sportscar Championship season